The Royal Family Order of Edward VII is an honour that was bestowed as a mark of personal esteem on female members of the British Royal Family by King Edward VII. The order is a personal memento rather than a state decoration. This award has been defunct since the death of its last surviving recipient, Mary of Teck, in 1953.

Appearance
The ribbon of Edward VII's Royal Family Order is based on his racing colours. They are (working outwards in) a red stripe, almost half the size of the centre stripe, a thin gold stripe, about one-fifth of the red stripe, and a blue stripe, almost double the red stripe. The red gold pattern is mirrored on both sides.

List of known recipients
Size 1:
Queen Alexandra, the King's wife

Size 2:
Princess of Wales later Queen Mary, the King's daughter-in-law
Princess Louise, Duchess of Fife later Princess Royal, the King's daughter
Princess Victoria, the King's daughter
Princess Maud of Denmark later Queen Maud of Norway, the King's daughter
Princess Christian of Schleswig-Holstein, the King's sister
Princess Louise, Duchess of Argyll, the King's sister
Princess Henry of Battenberg, the King's sister[]
Marie, Duchess of Edinburgh, the King's sister-in-law
The Duchess of Connaught and Strathearn, the King's sister-in-law
The Dowager Duchess of Albany, the King's sister-in-law
[1]

See also
 Royal Family Order of George IV
 Royal Order of Victoria and Albert
 Royal Family Order of George V
 Royal Family Order of George VI
 Royal Family Order of Elizabeth II

References

  for image of front and back.

British royal family
Orders of chivalry of the United Kingdom
Edward VII
1901 establishments in the United Kingdom
Royal family orders